William Lawrence Balls,  (3 September 1882 – 18 July 1960) was a British botanist who specialised in cotton technology. He was elected a Fellow of the Royal Society in 1923.

Biography

Education and early career
Balls, Born in Norfolk, the only son of William Balls and Emma Lawrence, W. L. Balls was educated at Norwich School, and at St John's College, Cambridge. After university, he applied for and was appointed to the new post of 'Cryptogamic Botanist' to the Khedivial Agricultural Society of Egypt in Cairo, which he took up in November 1904. He worked for the Society until 1910 when he was transferred to the newly founded Department of Agriculture of the Egyptian government as Botanist. 
In this period, he published 45 papers and the book, The Cotton Plant in Egypt, in which he summarised and added to his studies in genetics and physiology. The book became a botanical classic. Balls was elected a Fellow of St John's College in 1908.

1914 –1927
Balls returned to England in 1914, where he settled in Cambridgeshire and wrote The development and properties of raw cotton (1915) and Egypt and the Egyptians (1915). He was invited to start an Experimental Department for the
Fine Cotton Spinners' and Doublers' Association and, beginning with two rooms in Manchester and then a large house in Bollington, Cheshire three years later, he continued his studies of cotton fibre quality for the next ten years, mastering the art of cotton spinning and conducting research into cotton spinning technology.

During this period, he became chairman for the Joint Standing Committee of the Board of Trade Committee, which grew into the Empire Cotton Growing Corporation, and the Shirley Institute of the British Cotton Industry Research Association. He became a member of the Textiles Institute, Manchester, in 1916 and published the book, Handbook of cotton spinning tests (1920). He was elected a Fellow of the Royal Society in May 1923.

Balls resigned from his post with the Fine Cotton Spinners' and Doublers' Association at the end of 1925 to change his occupation. He returned to Cambridge and outlined his work of ten 
years in the book, Studies of quality in cotton (1928). The cotton quality reports published by Balls between 1912 and 1928 were to be cited by fibre physiologists and textile technologists for more than seventy years.

1927–1960
Soon afterwards, he was invited to return to Egypt as the head of all cotton work and was to remain there for the remainder of his working life. Personal research was limited but he was able to make great practical achievements using his administrative skills and to co-ordinate the work on cotton botany, agronomy and entomology. He studied the movement of water movement across all of the  farm for more than 25 years and used this information when writing The yields of a crop (1953) after his retirement. He established the concept of pure-line seed supply and a plant for the actual spinning of small samples. He discovered that deliberate genetical selection could be done for yarn strength, which was the most important discovery made in cotton breeding at that time. He gave the annual Textile Institute 'Mather Lecture' in 1931 on aspects of Egyptian cotton. The lecture, Current Changes in Technology of Cotton Spinning and Cultivation, was published in The Journal of the Textile Institute XXII:5 (1931). Dr. Balls was appointed a Commander of the Order of the British Empire (CBE) in 1934.

During World War II, Balls's services were used by the forces and he became Chairman of the Scientific Advisory Committee to the Commander-in-Chief at Middle East Headquarters, where he devoted much time to the invention of a mine detector.

Honours and wards
Balls was given Honorary Fellowship of the Textile Institute in 1943 and appointed Companion of the Order of St Michael and St George (CMG) in 1944. He was 'awarded honorary Doctorate', in 1953.

Retirement and death
Balls retired in 1947 and returned to Cambridgeshire, where he wrote his final book, The yield of a crop (1953), which defined the responsibility of the high water table for the decline in the Egyptian crop. He was awarded an Honorary DSc from the University of Manchester in 1952.

Balls died on 18 July 1960, at the age of 77.

Publications by Balls

 Balls, W. L. and Armenag K. Bedevian. (1929). The operation of the Seed control law upon the pedigree of cotton seed in seasons 1926-27 and 1927-28; 1926-30. Nº 85; Nº 104 de Bulletin, Egypt Wizārat al-Zirāʻah
 Balls, W. L. and Armenag K. Bedevian. (1929). The operation of the seed control law upon the pedigree of cotton seed in ... 1926–27 and 1927–28. Vol. 85 de Bulletin, Egypt Wizārat al-Zirāʻah

References

Bibliography
 

1882 births
1960 deaths
British botanists
Textile scientists
Companions of the Order of St Michael and St George
Commanders of the Order of the British Empire
Fellows of the Royal Society
People educated at Norwich School
Fellows of St John's College, Cambridge
Alumni of St John's College, Cambridge
People from Cambridge
People from Norfolk